(1542 – October 21, 1601) was a Japanese daimyō of the Sengoku period, who served the Takeda clan. He was the successor of his father Hoshina Masatoshi in the ranks of the senior Takeda retainers, and was given command of 250 cavalry. 

Masanao was driven out of Takatō Castle following a Siege of Takatō (1582), but was soon allowed to return through the assistance of the Hojo clan. Following a brief conflict with Tokugawa Ieyasu's forces, Masanao became a Tokugawa retainer, and was allowed to retain Takatō. He took part in the Siege of Odawara (1590) under Ieyasu's command, and moved to the Kantō region together with Ieyasu. In the Kantō, Masanao was granted the Tako Domain.

Family
 Father: Hoshina Masatoshi
 Wife: Takehime (1553–1618), half sister of Tokugawa Ieyasu
 Concubines:
 Atobeshi-dono
 Children:
 Hoshina Masamitsu by Atobeshi-dono
 Hoshina Masashige
 Hoshina Masasada by Takehime
 Hojo Ujishige by Takehime
 Eihime (1585–1635) married Kuroda Nagamasa by Takehime
 Teishoin (1591–1664) married Koide Yoshihide by Takehime
 daughter married Anbe Nobumori by Takehime
 daughter married Kato Akinari by Takehime
 daughter married Kohinata Genzaemon

Notes

References
 "Takeda kashindan hitokoto fairu" (17 Feb. 2008)
 "Hoshina-shi" on Harimaya.com (17 Feb. 2008)

Samurai
Daimyo
Hoshina clan
1542 births
1601 deaths